USS Ouachita was a steamer captured by the Union Navy during the American Civil War. She was used by the Navy to patrol navigable waterways of the Confederacy to prevent the South from trading with other countries.

Service history 

Union gunboats  and  captured Confederate side wheel steamer Louisville in the Little Red River 13 July 1863. The Navy purchased the prize from the Prize Court at Cairo, Illinois, 29 September 1863, and commissioned her as Ouachita 18 January 1864. Lt. Comdr. Byron Wilson assumed command 1 February. During the remainder of the Civil War, the gunboat operated in the Mississippi River and its tributaries, especially the Red, Black, and Ouachita Rivers. She participated in Rear Admiral David Dixon Porter’s expedition up the Red River to Alexandria 12 March to 22 May 1864. She performed patrol duty through the end of the war, and again ascended the Red River in May and June 1865 to receive the surrender of Confederate forces. Decommissioned 3 July 1865, Ouachita was sold at auction at Mound City, Illinois, 25 September 1865 to Tait, Able, and Gill.

See also

Anaconda Plan
Mississippi Squadron

References 

Ships of the Union Navy
Steamships of the United States Navy
Gunboats of the United States Navy
American Civil War patrol vessels of the United States